Georgi Rusenov Rusev (born 2 July 1998) is a Bulgarian professional footballer who plays for CSKA 1948 as a right winger.

Club career
Rusev started his youth career with the academy of DIT Sofia before moving to the academy of Spanish club Elche CF in 2016. On 27 August, he made his debut for the B-team, starting in a 1–0 defeat against CD Castellón. After being rarely used, he joined the reserve team of Getafe CF on 14 December 2017. On 5 June 2018, he returned to Bulgaria and joined Septemvri Sofia. On 23 July, he made his debut for the club in a 0–0 draw against FC Vereya.

International career
Rusev featured for the under-17 team in the 2015 UEFA European Under-17 Championship. He also represented the under-19 team in the 2017 UEFA European Under-19 Championship and scored the only goal of team in the tournament against Netherlands. 

Rusev received his first call-up for the Bulgaria national team on 5 September 2022, for the games of the UEFA Nations League games against Gibraltar and North Macedonia on 23 and 23 September 2022. He complete his debut in the match against Gibraltar on 23 September, won by Bulgaria with 5:1 result.

Career statistics

Club

References

External links

1998 births
Living people
Association football forwards
Bulgarian footballers
Elche CF Ilicitano footballers
Getafe CF B players
FC Septemvri Sofia players
FC CSKA 1948 Sofia players
Tercera División players
First Professional Football League (Bulgaria) players
Bulgaria youth international footballers